College of Food and Environment Technology in Buraydah was founded in 1977 in Buraydah in Saudi Arabia. It was converted from the Technical Institute to Buraydah College Of Agricultural Technology in 2000, and last renamed in 2008 to College of Food and Environment Technology in Buraydah.

CFET offers Bachelor's and Master's degree programs in several areas of study, including Food Science and Technology, Nutrition, Environmental Science, Agricultural Engineering, and Horticulture. 

In addition to academic programs, CFET is also involved in research and community service. The college conducts research on various topics related to food, nutrition, and the environment, and it collaborates with other institutions both locally and internationally.

External links
www.tvtc.gov.sa 

Educational institutions established in 1977
Universities and colleges in Saudi Arabia
Education in Buraidah
1977 establishments in Saudi Arabia